"What Hides Beneath" is the eighth episode of the first season of the TNT science fiction drama Falling Skies, which originally aired July 31, 2011.
The episode was written by Mark Verheiden and directed by Anthony Hemingway.

Colonel Porter returns to the 2nd Mass and informs them that not only has the 7th Mass been destroyed, there has also been no contact with the 4th and 5th Mass. Weaver orders Tom to scout out the massive Skitter structure and determine how best to destroy it.

Plot 
While scouting the Skitter command tower in downtown Boston, Tom, Hal and Weaver spy a tall, humanoid alien species directing Skitters.  They appear to be the "officers" or master-race commanding or controlling the Skitters.  Tom theorizes that the reason they haven't seen them before is because in a normal military occupation, high-ranking officers don't expose themselves in open territory until they feel confident that they've secured a region.

Weaver, who used to run a construction business, observes the alien tower and notes that both the aliens construction techniques and building materials are fairly imitative of those found on Earth.  They seem to be using fairly basic construction techniques, and while they do have access to some exotic materials in their ships and Mechs, their large-scale structures seem to be made out of basic construction materials found on Earth like concrete and steel rebar.  Hal points out that this explains what they were doing with all of the scrap metal they were making the harnessed children collect.

Back in the high school base camp, Pope has been assisting Uncle Scott in examining the wreckage of some of the Mechs they have managed to destroy, and Matt pokes around as he works.  Pope explains that from what they can discern from the wreckage, even the Mechs are imitative of Earth technology, or as he puts it, "they're really big into recycling".  Mech bodies are made using an exotic alien alloy - which they dub simply "Mech-metal" - which is tough enough to stop small arms fire while remaining compact and lightweight.  However, their built-in autocannons use standard munitions.  The Mechs are not simply using cartridges of similar size to Earth rounds; instead when Pope opened up the magazine in a Mech gun, he found Earth-built cartridges with human manufacturer markings on them.  Pope's theory is that after the opening wave of the invasion, the initial EMP detonation and mass air strikes, the aliens began raiding every major armory and ammunition depot they could gain access to, then took the cartridges to use in their Mechs.  The only difference is that they changed the tips on each of the cartridges so they fire bullets made out of exotic Mech-metal, making each shot armor-piercing (which Pope compares to using depleted uranium tipped rounds, but much more powerful).  The human resistance does not know why the aliens are using Earth building materials and ammunition, only vaguely speculating that the aliens planned for the invasion to rely on local resources to support itself.  Matt remarks that it's not fair that the Mech-metal used in the Skitters' robots gives them such an edge in combat that the humans don't have, which inspires Pope to start experimenting around with the recovered Mech-metal they have.

Meanwhile, Dr. Anne Glass decides to perform an autopsy on the corpse of the Skitter she killed, which she hasn't had a chance to perform yet because of the temporary evacuation instigated by the incident with the 7th Mass. All previous attempts to perform autopsies on dead Skitters have been unsuccessful, because their innards rapidly decompose into unrecognizable mush very soon after they die.  In the first months of the invasion the humans were just running for their lives and couldn't carry Skitter corpses back from the front lines, and even when they could bring one back later on, they had already decomposed internally.  Because the captured Skitter died right inside of their base, it's their first real opportunity to successfully autopsy one.  Lourdes assists Anne with the procedure, because as a first year medical student she's the closest thing to a nurse she has.  They discover that while the Skitters have tough leathery skin and carapace armor, their internal structure isn't that much different from terrestrial vertebrates, including an endoskeleton, cardio-vascular system, and nervous system.  Anne then confirms her fears when she saws through the armored carapace of the Skitter's back, and finds that it has a harness attached to its spine, identical in structure to the ones attached to the human children.  The implications to Anne are clear:  the Skitters were themselves harnessed, and might not always have been Skitters.  Particularly because the harness was found within their outer carapace, it seems that they used to be some other kind of lifeform, captured by the tall humanoid aliens who used the harnesses to mutate them into shock-troops.  Anne realizes this means that the harnessed children are being slowly mutated, either into Skitters or something like them.

While returning to base, the scouting team meets a strange woman (Blair Brown) that invites them into her home. Tom and Hal take up her offer while Weaver guards their motorbikes. While inside, Weaver takes off, having removed the spark plugs on Tom and Hal's bikes. They eventually track him down to his old house where Tom finds him drinking whiskey in the backyard. Weaver explains that he had separated from his wife before the invasion and couldn't find her when the attack began. He found his younger daughter who had been harnessed and inadvertently killed her in removing it. They are interrupted when a Mech shows up, forcing Hal to hide and Tom and Weaver to work together to destroy it. Realizing that the only person who knew their location was the strange woman they met earlier, they return to her apartment and discover she is an agent of the Skitters who use her to capture people. While questioning her, a young woman turns up at the door inquiring whether any more people have been there. She turns out to be Karen, Hal's girlfriend, who has now been captured and harnessed. Before Hal can do anything, Tom looks through the peep hole and comes face to face with one of the new tall aliens.  Hal is desperate to save Karen but Tom has to hold him back, because there's no way they can capture her without alerting the aliens to their presence.  Deciding that the woman - who seems mentally disturbed after losing her family in the invasion - cannot be trusted, Tom lies to her about the direction they are actually heading as they leave.

They return to the school with this news and find Pope demonstrating that a bullet made out of Mech armor can penetrate the Mech itself, to the applause of onlookers.  Weaver orders teams to start melting down as much Mech-metal as they have into bullets, which will even the odds the next time the aliens face them and each soldier is firing armor-piercing rounds.  Rick, who observed this, takes off, followed by Ben.

Reception

Ratings 
In its original American broadcast, "What Hides Beneath" was seen by an estimated 4.31 million household viewers, according to Nielsen Media Research. The episode received a 1.5 rating among viewers between ages 18 and 49; the highest rated episode since the series premiere.

Reviews 
Eric Goldman of IGN gave the episode a score of 8 out of 10, enjoying Weaver's storyline. "The fact that Weaver, in his attempt to remove a harness from his daughter, ended up killing her was an incredibly dark and bleak aspect to add to the character – and a very compelling one," he said.

References 

2011 American television episodes
Falling Skies (season 1) episodes